The Northwestern State–Southeastern Louisiana football rivalry is an American college football rivalry between the Northwestern State Demons and the Southeastern Louisiana Lions. Both schools are members of the University of Louisiana System, and compete together as members of the Southland Conference.

The two teams have met 67 times on the football field, and Southeastern Louisiana currently leads the all-time series 38–29.

Game results

See also  
 List of NCAA college football rivalry games

References

College football rivalries in the United States
Northwestern State Demons football
Southeastern Louisiana Lions football
1935 establishments in Louisiana